Hoani Turi Te Whatahoro Jury (4 February 1841–26 September 1923) was a New Zealand Ngāti Kahungunu scholar, recorder and interpreter. He was born in Wairarapa, New Zealand on 4 February 1841. His mother was Te Aitu-o-te-rangi Jury and his father John Milsome Jury, an Englishman.

In 1892 he was elected chairman of Te Kotahitanga, the movement for an autonomous Māori parliament, at its first meeting at Waipatu. At the second sitting of Te Kotahitanga in 1893 he was elected premier. His premiership was mired by accusations of financial mismanagement made by his predecessor and successor, Hamiora Mangakahia.

References

1841 births
1923 deaths
Interpreters
Ngāti Kahungunu people
New Zealand Māori academics
New Zealand Māori writers